Abanyom, or Bakor, is a language of the Ekoid subfamily of Niger–Congo.   It is spoken by the Abanyom people in the Cross River State region of Nigeria.  A member of the Southern Bantoid group, Abanyom is fairly closely related to the Bantu languages. It is tonal and has a typical Niger–Congo noun class system.

Abanyom is also a clan/Ward in Ikom. It comprises the following Communities; Edor, Abangork, Akumabal, Abinti, Nkim, Nkum, Nkarassi 11, Nkarassi 1, Abankang, Etikpe, and Nkonfap. 
Abankang is referred to as the mother of Abanyom.

References

Sources
Asinya, O.E. 1987. A reconstruction of the Segmental phonology of Bakor (an Ekoid Bantu language). M.A. Linguistics, University of Port Harcourt

External links
 Abanyom basic lexicon at the Global Lexicostatistical Database
 Listen to a sample of Abanyom from Global Recordings Network

Languages of Nigeria
Ekoid languages